Xavier Legrand (born 28 March 1979) is a French actor, scriptwriter and filmmaker. Legrand was nominated for an Academy Award for Best Live Action Short Film for the 2013 film Avant que de tout perdre (Just Before Losing Everything). His first feature Custody was in competition at the 74th Venice Film Festival and earned Legrand the Silver Lion for Best Director.

Selected filmography
 Just Before Losing Everything (2013, short film)
 Custody (2017)

References

External links

1979 births
Living people
French film directors
Venice Best Director Silver Lion winners